Lingfield Wildlife Area is a   Local Nature Reserve in Lingfield in Surrey. It is owned by  Tandridge District Council and managed by the Lingfield Wildlife Area Committee.

This site adjoins Centenary Fields and both are managed by local volunteers. There is a wildlife area, copses, a pond, a wetland area, hedges, meadows and a skateboard ramp.

There is access from Saxbys Lane.

References

Local Nature Reserves in Surrey